Andover Township is a township in Sussex County, New Jersey, United States.  As of the 2020 United States Census, the township's population was 5,996, a decrease of 323 since the 2010 Census. In the 2010 United States Census, the township's population was 6,319, reflecting an increase of 286 (+4.7%) from the 6,033 counted in the 2000 Census, which had in turn increased by 595 (+10.9%) from the 5,438 counted in the 1990 Census.

Andover was incorporated as a township by an act of the New Jersey Legislature on April 11, 1864, from portions of Newton Township, which was split up on that date and dissolved. Portions of the township were taken to form Fredon Township (February 24, 1904) and Andover borough (March 25, 1904). Portions of the township were ceded to Newton town in both 1869 and 1927.

The township was suggestively named after the existing village of Andover, whose name origin is not certain, though sources indicate that the name comes from Andover, Hampshire, England. In the years before World War II, Andover Township was home to Camp Nordland, a retreat and gathering place covering  owned and operated by the German American Bund, an American Nazi organization devoted to promoting a favorable view of Nazi Germany. Camp Nordland was shut down by the federal government after Germany declared war on the United States and sold at auction in 1944. The property eventually was acquired by Andover Township and is now called Hillside Park with a recreational hall and sports fields.

Geography
According to the United States Census Bureau, the township had a total area of 20.79 square miles (53.85 km2), including 20.05 square miles (51.92 km2) of land and 0.75 square miles (1.93 km2) of water (3.59%).

Unincorporated communities, localities and place names located partially or completely within the township include Brighton, County Road Camp, Davis Pond, Drakes Pond, Garders Lake, Iliffs Lake, Lake Aeroflex, Lake Iliff, Lake Lenape, Long Pond, Mulford, New Waywayanda Lake, Pinkneyville, Redings Pond, Springdale, Stickle Pond, Sussex Mills, Whitehall and Whites Pond.

The township borders the Sussex County municipalities of Andover, Byram Township, Fredon Township, Green Township, Hampton Township, Lafayette Township and Sparta Township.

Demographics

Census 2010

The Census Bureau's 2006–2010 American Community Survey showed that (in 2010 inflation-adjusted dollars) median household income was $95,313 (with a margin of error of +/− $10,064) and the median family income was $105,554 (+/− $13,995). Males had a median income of $72,066 (+/− $10,198) versus $47,750 (+/− $8,020) for females. The per capita income for the borough was $38,284 (+/− $4,082). About 2.3% of families and 2.9% of the population were below the poverty line, including 1.0% of those under age 18 and none of those age 65 or over.

Census 2000

As of the 2000 United States Census there were 6,033 people, 1,889 households, and 1,499 families residing in the township.  The population density was 298.9 people per square mile (115.4/km2).  There were 1,968 housing units at an average density of 97.5 per square mile (37.7/km2).  The racial makeup of the township was 94.45% White, 1.86% African American, 0.08% Native American, 2.30% Asian, 0.03% Pacific Islander, 0.60% from other races, and 0.68% from two or more races. Hispanic or Latino of any race were 2.25% of the population.

There were 1,889 households, out of which 39.8% had children under the age of 18 living with them, 67.9% were married couples living together, 8.0% had a female householder with no husband present, and 20.6% were non-families. 16.1% of all households were made up of individuals, and 5.0% had someone living alone who was 65 years of age or older.  The average household size was 2.80 and the average family size was 3.16.

In the township the population was spread out, with 25.0% under the age of 18, 4.6% from 18 to 24, 28.9% from 25 to 44, 25.7% from 45 to 64, and 15.7% who were 65 years of age or older.  The median age was 40 years. For every 100 females, there were 91.9 males.  For every 100 females age 18 and over, there were 87.2 males.

The median income for a household in the township was $75,748, and the median income for a family was $78,439. Males had a median income of $57,098 versus $36,268 for females. The per capita income for the township was $29,180.  About 1.3% of families and 3.5% of the population were below the poverty line, including 1.9% of those under age 18 and 5.3% of those age 65 or over.

Government

Local government
Andover Township is governed under the Township form of New Jersey municipal government, one of 141 municipalities (of the 564) statewide that use this form, the second-most commonly used form of government in the state. The Township Committee is comprised of five members, who are elected directly by the voters at-large in partisan elections to serve three-year terms of office on a staggered basis, with either one or two seats coming up for election each year as part of the November general election in a three-year cycle. At an annual reorganization held in January, the council selects a mayor and a deputy mayor from among its members.

, members of the Andover Township Committee are Mayor Thomas D. Walsh (R, term on township committee ends December 31, 2023; term as mayor ends 2022), Deputy Mayor Ellsworth E. Bensley Jr. (R, term on committee and as deputy mayor ends 2022), John Carafello (R, 2023), Eric Karr (R, 2024) and Janis L. McGovern (R, 2024).

Federal, state and county representation
Andover Township is located in the 5th Congressional district and is part of New Jersey's 24th state legislative district.

 

Sussex County is governed by a Board of County Commissioners whose five members are elected at-large in partisan elections on a staggered basis, with either one or two seats coming up for election each year. At an annual reorganization meeting held in the beginning of January, the board selects a Commissioner Director and Deputy Director from among its members, with day-to-day supervision of the operation of the county delegated to a County Administrator. , Sussex County's Commissioners are 
Commissioner Director Anthony Fasano (R, Hopatcong, term as commissioner and as commissioner director ends December 31, 2022), 
Deputy Director Chris Carney (R, Frankford Township, term as commissioner ends 2024; term as deputy director ends 2022), 
Dawn Fantasia (R, Franklin, 2024), 
Jill Space (R, Wantage Township, 2022; appointed to serve an unexpired term) and 
Herbert Yardley (R, Stillwater Township, 2023). In May 2022, Jill Space was appointed to fill the seat expiring in December 2022 that had been held by Sylvia Petillo until she resigned from office.

Constitutional officers elected on a countywide basis are 
County Clerk Jeffrey M. Parrott (R, Wantage Township, 2026),
Sheriff Michael F. Strada (R, Hampton Township, 2022) and 
Surrogate Gary R. Chiusano (R, Frankford Township, 2023). The County Administrator is Gregory V. Poff II, whose appointment expires in 2025.

Politics
As of March 23, 2011, there were a total of 3,979 registered voters in Andover Township, of which 606 (15.2% vs. 16.5% countywide) were registered as Democrats, 1,813 (45.6% vs. 39.3%) were registered as Republicans and 1,552 (39.0% vs. 44.1%) were registered as Unaffiliated. There were 8 voters registered as Libertarians or Greens. Among the township's 2010 Census population, 63.0% (vs. 65.8% in Sussex County) were registered to vote, including 80.8% of those ages 18 and over (vs. 86.5% countywide).

In the 2012 presidential election, Republican Mitt Romney received 1,703 votes (60.7% vs. 59.4% countywide), ahead of Democrat Barack Obama with 1,034 votes (36.8% vs. 38.2%) and other candidates with 62 votes (2.2% vs. 2.1%), among the 2,807 ballots cast by the township's 4,074 registered voters, for a turnout of 68.9% (vs. 68.3% in Sussex County). In the 2008 presidential election, Republican John McCain received 1,772 votes (59.0% vs. 59.2% countywide), ahead of Democrat Barack Obama with 1,173 votes (39.1% vs. 38.7%) and other candidates with 37 votes (1.2% vs. 1.5%), among the 3,002 ballots cast by the township's 3,948 registered voters, for a turnout of 76.0% (vs. 76.9% in Sussex County). In the 2004 presidential election, Republican George W. Bush received 1,799 votes (64.0% vs. 63.9% countywide), ahead of Democrat John Kerry with 966 votes (34.4% vs. 34.4%) and other candidates with 30 votes (1.1% vs. 1.3%), among the 2,811 ballots cast by the township's 3,566 registered voters, for a turnout of 78.8% (vs. 77.7% in the whole county).

In the 2013 gubernatorial election, Republican Chris Christie received 71.2% of the vote (1,212 cast), ahead of Democrat Barbara Buono with 25.1% (427 votes), and other candidates with 3.8% (64 votes), among the 1,718 ballots cast by the township's 4,121 registered voters (15 ballots were spoiled), for a turnout of 41.7%. In the 2009 gubernatorial election, Republican Chris Christie received 1,271 votes (64.4% vs. 63.3% countywide), ahead of Democrat Jon Corzine with 482 votes (24.4% vs. 25.7%), Independent Chris Daggett with 195 votes (9.9% vs. 9.1%) and other candidates with 22 votes (1.1% vs. 1.3%), among the 1,974 ballots cast by the township's 3,882 registered voters, yielding a 50.9% turnout (vs. 52.3% in the county).

Education
Public school students in pre-kindergarten through eighth grade attend the Andover Regional School District, together with students from Andover Borough. As of the 2017–2018 school year, the district, comprised of two schools, had an enrollment of 470 students and 47.9 classroom teachers (on an FTE basis), for a student–teacher ratio of 9.8:1. Schools in the district (with 2017–2018 enrollment data from the National Center for Education Statistics) are 
Florence M. Burd Elementary School (220 students in grades Pre-K–4) and 
Long Pond Middle School (244 students in grades 5–8). The district's board of education has nine members who set policy and oversee the fiscal and educational operation of the district through its administration, with Andover Township assigned eight of the nine seats, based on the population of the two constituent municipalities.

Public school students in ninth through twelfth grades attend Newton High School in Newton, together with students from Andover Township and Green Township, as part of a sending/receiving relationship with the Newton Public School District. As of the 2017–2018 school year, the high school had an enrollment of 719 students and 67.5 classroom teachers (on an FTE basis), for a student–teacher ratio of 10.6:1.

Transportation

U.S. Route 206 is the main highway serving Andover Township. County Route 517 also passes through the township.

Notable people

People who were born in, residents of, or otherwise closely associated with Andover Township include:

 Gail Phoebus (born 1950), member of the New Jersey General Assembly, who previously served on the Andover Township Committee and as a Sussex County Freeholder

References

External links

 Andover Township website
 Andover Township Economic Development website
 Andover Regional School District
 
 Andover Regional School District, National Center for Education Statistics
 Newton High School
 The Township Journal, community newspaper

 
1864 establishments in New Jersey
Populated places established in 1864
Township form of New Jersey government
Townships in Sussex County, New Jersey